was a  after Gen'ei and before Tenji. This period spanned the years from April 1120 through April 1124.

Change of era
 February 1, 1120 : The new era name was created to mark an event or series of events. The previous era ended and the new one commenced in Gen'ei 3, on the 10th day of the 4th month of 1120.

Events of the Hōan era
 1121 (Hōan 2, 5th month): The priests of Mt. Hiei set fire to Mii-dera.
 February 25, 1123 (Hōan 4, on the 28th day of the 1st month): In the 17th year of Emperor Toba's reign (鳥羽天皇17年), Toba was forced to abdicate by his father, retired-Emperor Shirakawa. Toba gave up the throne in favor of his son Akihito, who would become Emperor Sutoku. Toba was only 21 years old when he renounced his title; and he had already reigned for 16 years:  two in the nengō Tennin, three in Ten'ei, five in the nengō Eikyū, two in Gen'ei, and four in the nengō Hōan.  At this time, Toba took the title Daijō-tennō. The succession (senso) was received by his son.
 1123 (Hōan 4, 2nd month): Emperor Sutoku is said to have acceded to the throne (sokui).

Notes

References
 Brown, Delmer M. and Ichirō Ishida, eds. (1979).  Gukanshō: The Future and the Past. Berkeley: University of California Press. ;  OCLC 251325323
 Nussbaum, Louis-Frédéric and Käthe Roth. (2005).  Japan encyclopedia. Cambridge: Harvard University Press. ;  OCLC 58053128
 Titsingh, Isaac. (1834). Nihon Odai Ichiran; ou,  Annales des empereurs du Japon.  Paris: Royal Asiatic Society, Oriental Translation Fund of Great Britain and Ireland. OCLC 5850691
 Varley, H. Paul. (1980). A Chronicle of Gods and Sovereigns: Jinnō Shōtōki of Kitabatake Chikafusa. New York: Columbia University Press. ;  OCLC 6042764

External links
 National Diet Library, "The Japanese Calendar" -- historical overview plus illustrative images from library's collection

Japanese eras